The Western Heritage Museum & Lea County Cowboy Hall of Fame is a museum near Hobbs, New Mexico. It features exhibits depicting the history of the Llano Estacado region of eastern New Mexico and northwestern Texas. Opened in January 2006, the museum is housed in a  building on the campus of New Mexico Junior College.

Lea County Cowboy Hall of Fame 
The Cowboy Hall of Fame is presented annually to up to four individuals. Up to three individuals can be selected by the following criteria:

 They have roots in Lea County
 They were exceptional in their rodeo career
 They made significant contributions to Lea County in ranching

A fourth inductee can be selected by the Board of Directors using their own criteria.

Hall of Fame Inductees 

1978
 Clyde Browning
 John Easley
 Pello Etcheverry
 Jake McClure
 Henry Record
 George Weir
 Dow Wood

1979
 Tom Bingham
 Troy Fort
 Mary S. Hooper
 Earl Kornegay
 Dessie Sawyer
 Andrew Coke Taylor

1980
 Daniel C. Berry
 George Causey
 Robert Florence Love
 Warren Snyder
 Will Terry

1981
 Samantha Anderson
 Marrion Ruben Bess
 John Davidson Graham
 Richard David Lee

1982
 Jimmie Baum Cooper
 Alfred Green Rushing
 Adam Zimmerman

1983
Roy Dale Cooper
 John Simeon Eaves
 Claudie A. Fort

1984
 Allen Clinton Heard
 Amos Dee Jones
 James Lewis Reed

1985
 Bob Beverly
 John Merchant
 Bill Zimmerman

1986
 W.A. Anderson
 Daisy Clayton
 Nellie Taylor

1987
 Millard Eidson
 Rubert Madera

1988
 Gene Price
 Olin Young

1989
 Clay McGonagill
 Bert Weir

1991
 Edith Davis Fanning
 Buddy Melton Medlin

1992
 Dale "Tuffy" Cooper
 Willim S. "Colonel" Williams

1993
 M.R. "Russ" Anderson
 J.W. "Uncle Jim" Owens

1994
 Charles Walter Fairweather
 Matthew Hawkins Medlin

1995
Fern Sawyer
 William Robert Bilbrey

1996
 W.D. "Jiggs" Dinwiddle
 Tom Pearson

1997 
 John Lusk
 U.D. "Ulysses" Sawyer

1998
 Betty Gayle Cooper Ratliff
 Tom Linebery

1999
 Ella Belle Holeman
 John Pearson

2000
 Herchel R. "Gravy" Field
 John Byron Fort

2001
 Homer Ingle

2002
 Bill Lee
 Virgil Linam
 Giles Lee

2003
 Tom Bess
 Suzanne Jones

2004
 Punch Jones
 Marvin Powell

2005
 Sanford Bilberry
 R.D. Sims

2006
 Bob Eidson

2007
 Becky Jo Doom
 Richard D. Lee
 Larry F. Wooten
 Kenny Smith

2008
 Bill Brininstool
 Roy "Buddy" Fort

2009
 Sam Bruton
 Faye Linam

2010
 Scharbauer Eidson
 Bill Smith

2011
 Kress Jones
 Charlie Daymon Hardin

2012
 Gene Cessnun
 Walter "Lee" Greebon
 William Daniel "Dub" McWhorter

2013
 Charles William "C.W." Kinsolving
 Evelyn Muriel Terry McNeill
 Hugh "Rack" Ward

2015
Guy Allen
 Dorthy Bess
 Jimmie Torn Cooper
 Carl E. Sams

2016
 Bert Madera
 Phil Smith Sr.
 Charlcia Taylor

2017
 Bennet Jackson Caudill
 Jerry B. Clayton
 Mathias Willhoit

2018
 Charlie Butler "C.B." Cochran
 Herbert Neil Love

Sources:

References

External links
 Official Website

Cowboy halls of fame
Halls of fame in New Mexico
History museums in New Mexico
University museums in New Mexico
Museums in Lea County, New Mexico
American West museums in New Mexico
Museums established in 2006
2006 establishments in New Mexico
New Mexico Junior College